First Course is the debut album by jazz guitarist Lee Ritenour. The album was released on LP by Epic Records in 1976 and on CD by Columbia Records in 1990.

Reception
First Course was made when Ritenour was considered the best session musician in Los Angeles next to guitarist Larry Carlton. He recorded the album with peers from Dante's and the Baked Potato club in Studio City, California. AllMusic called the album an "artifact of the early L.A. jazz/funk sound".

Ritenour worried about the album. "I was still thinking as a studio musician, and I was very worried about having my own identity on the guitar, because up until that time my job as a studio musician had been to be a 'chameleon'...it wasn't until several years later that I felt more comfortable with who I was stylistically."

Financial problems plagued the album because the "sound perplexed studio executives," who were looking for the next Bitches Brew or Return to Forever. This was melodic rhythm and blues-based jazz that fell just outside the boundaries of "Fusion" and didn't find a home until newly formatted radio stations began to popularize two emerging genres in the mid to late 80's - The genre broadly known as Smooth Jazz, and also "New Age" music, between which there was considerable overlap.

Track listing

Personnel 
 Lee Ritenour – guitars (1-4, 6, 8); classical guitars (5, 9)
 Bill Dickinson – bass (1, 8)
 Louis Johnson – bass (2, 6)
 Chuck Rainey – bass (3, 4, 7)
 Dave Grusin – electric piano (1-3, 6-9); synthesizers (2, 3, 6, 7, 9); organ (4); clavinet (8); acoustic piano (9); horns arrangement (4, 6)
 Michael Omartian – clavinet (1); horns arrangement (1)
 Larry Nash – clavinet (2, 4, 6); acoustic piano (4)
 Jerry Peters – clavinet (3); acoustic piano, synthesizers (7)
 Patrice Rushen – clavinet (8)
 Harvey Mason – drums (1-3, 6-8);  percussion (2, 3)
 Ed Greene – drums (4)
 Jerry Steinholtz – percussion (3, 7, 8); congas (7, 8)
 Ian Underwood – synthesizer programming (2, 3, 6, 7, 9)
 Tom Scott – tenor saxophone (1, 8: solos; 2, 4, 6); lyricon (4, 8: solos); horns arrangement (2, 8)
 Ernie Watts – tenor saxophone (1)
 Jerome Richardson – baritone saxophone (1, 2, 4, 6, 8)
 Chuck Findley – trumpet (1, 2, 4, 6, 8)
 Frank Rosolino – trombone (1, 2, 4, 6, 8)

References

External links
 Entry at Discogs

1976 debut albums
Lee Ritenour albums
Epic Records albums